Kruševo is a town in North Macedonia.

Kruševo or Krushevo may also refer to:

Bosnia and Herzegovina 
 Kruševo, Foča
 Kruševo, Olovo
 Kruševo, Stolac

Bulgaria
 Krushevo, Blagoevgrad Province
 Krushevo, Gabrovo Province
 Krushevo, Plovdiv Province, a settlement in Parvomay Municipality
 Old name of Beloslav

Croatia
 Kruševo, Zadar County, a village near Obrovac, Croatia
 Kruševo, Šibenik-Knin County, a village near Primošten, Croatia
 Kruševo, Požega-Slavonia County, a former village near Brestovac, Croatia

Greece 
 Old name of Achladochori, Serres

Montenegro
 Kruševo, Gusinje
 Kruševo, Pljevlja

North Macedonia
 Kruševo, Vinica, a village near Vinica

Serbia
 , a hamlet of the village of Veliko Orašje, Serbia
 Kruševo (Novi Pazar), a village in Serbia
 Kruševo (Prijepolje), a village in Serbia